Hermann Anastas Bahr (19 July 1863 – 15 January 1934) was an Austrian writer, playwright, director, and critic.

Biography
Born and raised in Linz, Bahr studied in Vienna, Graz, Czernowitz and Berlin, devoting special attention to philosophy, political economy, philology and law. During a prolonged stay in Paris, he discovered his interest in literature and art. He began working as an art critic, first in Berlin, then in Vienna. In 1890 he became associate editor of Berliner Freie Bühne (Berlin Free Stage), and later became associate editor and critic of the Deutsche Zeitung (German Newspaper). In 1894 he began publication of Die Zeit (The Times), and was also editor of the Neue Wiener Tagblatt (New Vienna Daily Flyer) and the Oesterreichische Volkszeitung (Austrian Popular Newspaper).

In 1906–07, Bahr worked with Max Reinhardt as a director at the German Theater in Berlin, and starting in 1918 he was a Dramaturg with the Vienna Burgtheater.

Spokesman for the literary group Young Vienna, Bahr was an active member of the Austrian avant-garde, producing both criticism and Impressionist plays. Bahr's association with the coffeehouse literati made him one of the main targets of Karl Kraus's satirical journal Die Fackel (The Torch) after Kraus's falling out with the group.

Bahr was the first critic to apply the label modernism to literary works, and was an early observer of Expressionism. His theoretical papers were important in the definition of new literary categories. His 40 plays and around 10 novels never reached the quality of his theoretical work. He died, aged 70, in Munich.

Selected fiction

Plays
 The New People (Die neuen Menschen – 1887)
 The Mother (Die Mutter – 1891)
Das Tschaperl (1897)
Der Star (1899)
Wienerinnen (1900) 
Der Krampus (1902)
Ringelspiel (1907)
The Concert (Das Konzert – 1909) 
The Children (Die Kinder – 1911)
Das Prinzip (1912)
Der Querulant (1914)
The Master (Der Meister – 1904)

Short stories and novellas
The School of Love (Die gute Schule. Seelenstände – 1890)
Fin de siècle (1891)
Die Rahl (1908)
O Mensch (1910)
Österreich in Ewigkeit (1929)

Selected nonfiction

Essays
Zur Kritik der Moderne (1890)
Die Überwindung des Naturalismus (1891)
Symbolisten (1894)
Wiener Theater (1899)
Frauenrecht (1912) eLibrary Austria Project (elib austria full text)
Inventur (1912)
Expressionismus (1916)
Burgtheater (1920)

Books
Theater (1897)
Drut (1909)
Himmelfahrt (1916)
Die Rotte Korahs (1919)
Self-Portrait (Selbstbildnis – 1923), an autobiography

References

External links

Hermann Bahr on the eLibrary Austria Project (Information and eLib Austria full txts)
Bibliography of his books as well as (English) translations, articles to download and literature
Research group at the Leuphana University Lüneburg currently assembling and publishing Bahr's critical writings, essays, and articles

 

1863 births
1934 deaths
Writers from Linz
19th-century Austrian dramatists and playwrights
20th-century Austrian dramatists and playwrights
Austrian male dramatists and playwrights
Young Vienna